Kumbale may refer to:

 Kumbale, Kerala, a town in India
 Kumbale language, a language of Nepal